Owen Betterton West (August 1, 1869 – August 20, 1948) was an American farmer, businessman, and politician.

Biography
West was born on a farm in Salem Township, Knox County, Illinois. He went to the Yates City, Illinois public schools and to Lombard College in Galesburg, Illinois. West also sent to Brown's Business College. He was a farmer and businessman. West lived in Yaes City with his wife and family. He served as mayor of Yates City and was a Republican. West served in the Illinois House of Representatives from 1915 to 1927. West died from a heart attack.

References

External links

1869 births
1948 deaths
People from Knox County, Illinois
Lombard College alumni
Businesspeople from Illinois
Farmers from Illinois
Mayors of places in Illinois
Republican Party members of the Illinois House of Representatives